"Wear My Hat" is a song by English drummer Phil Collins released as the fifth single from his album Dance into the Light. It was only released in the United Kingdom and peaked at #43 on the UK Singles Chart. Collins said in an interview that the song and its music video is about the pressures of fame and how some fans grow an attachment to their favourite stars. The video for the song featured actor Danny DeVito.

The song was played throughout the Trip into the Light World Tour and on the First Final Farewell Tour. A live performance of the song was also recorded for Top of the Pops. However it was not aired (at the time) most likely due to its very low charting position, but it was then was shown in full on an episode of Top of the Pops 2 several years later.

Track listing
"Wear My Hat" – 4:44
"Wear My Hat" (Edited Hat Dance Mix) – 4:57
"Wear My Hat" (Hat Dance Mix) – 9:09
"Wear My Hat" (Wear My Dub) – 6:40

Charts

Credits 
 Phil Collins – drums, vocals
 Brad Cole – keyboards
 Daryl Stuermer – lead guitar
 Ronnie Caryl – rhythm guitar
 Nathan East – bass
 Amy Keys – backing vocals
 Arnold McCuller – backing vocals
 Vine Street Horns 
 Andrew Woolfolk – saxophone
 Arturo Velasco – trombone
 Harry Kim – trumpet
 Daniel Fornero – trumpet

Notes

1997 singles
Phil Collins songs
Songs written by Phil Collins
Song recordings produced by Phil Collins
Song recordings produced by Hugh Padgham
1995 songs
Virgin Records singles